The Renault R23 is a Formula One car that competed in the 2003 Formula One season. The driver lineup were Jarno Trulli and Fernando Alonso who replaced Jenson Button who left for British American Racing.

Design and development 
The chassis was designed by Mike Gascoyne, Bob Bell, Tim Densham and John Iley with Pat Symonds overseeing the design and production of the car as executive director of Engineering and Jean-Jacques His leading the engine design. 

Renault was innovative during this period producing non-standard designs such as the 111° 10-cylinder engine for the 2003 RS23 which was designed to effectively lower the center of gravity of the engine and thus improve the car's handling. This eventually proved too unreliable and heavy, so Renault returned to a 72 degree vee angle with the following year's R24.

R23B 
A "B Specification" car named the Renault R23B made its debut at the British Grand Prix and used for the remainder of the 2003 season.

Racing history
The Renault R23 was launched at an official ceremony in Lucerne, Switzerland in January, 2003. At this initial launch, it was confirmed sponsor Mild Seven would be continuing to be the primary sponsor of the team. Just days later, the Renault team re-launched the car at the Paul Ricard Circuit in France. The double launch was caused by Renault promising a branded car launch for sponsor Mild Seven, something that would be illegal in France. Both Trulli and Alonso completed laps of the circuit in the car at Paul Ricard to begin the new season for the team. The team had an extensive pre season test program, including former Toyota driver turned Renault reserve driver Allan McNish.  Following the pre-season, the technical team including Pat Symonds were satisfied with the progress from 2002.

The season started well, with both drivers scoring points at the 2003 Australian Grand Prix. Alonso taking advantage of the new points system, allowing him to secure two points for seventh place.  At the following race in Malaysia, Fernando Alonso secured pole position.  Alonso was both the youngest driver and first Spaniard to take a pole position in F1 at the time. In the race, Alonso would finish in third taking his first podium in Formula One. 

At the third race of the season in Brazil, Alonso would once again take third place. However, the chaotic Grand Prix saw him secure this following a major accident with debris from an earlier crash caused by Mark Webber in the Jaguar. Whilst Trulli's form in the R23 began to falter, Alonso continued to impress scoring points on a regular basis and a career best second place at his home race, the 2003 Spanish Grand Prix. Following a double retirement at the 2003 French Grand Prix, Renault introduced the R23B spec car for the British Grand Prix, an aerodynamic upgrade from the original R23.  It took Jarno Trulli to a third place podium just weeks later in Germany.

The 2003 Hungarian Grand Prix would be a momentous one for the team.  Fernando Alonso won the race, becoming the youngest driver since Bruce McLaren to do 44 years prior. In addition to being the first Spanish driver to win a race in history, Alonso also delivered the teams first victory since Alain Prost at the 1983 Austrian Grand Prix as a full constructor and the 1997 Luxembourg Grand Prix as an engine supplier.

The final three races of the season saw Alonso score one point and two retirements, while team mate Trulli took the R23B to another two points scoring finishes.

The R23 and R23B steered Renault to a fourth place finish in the Constructors' Championship with 88 points.

Complete Formula One results
(key) (results in bold indicate pole position, results in italics indicate fastest lap)

References

R23
2003 Formula One season cars